Martin Luther University of Halle-Wittenberg, also referred to as MLU, is a public, research-oriented university in the cities of Halle and Wittenberg, and is the largest and oldest university in the German state of Saxony-Anhalt. MLU offers German and international (English) courses leading to academic degrees such as BA, BSc, MA, MSc, doctoral degrees, and Habilitation.

The university was created in 1817 through the merger of the University of Wittenberg (founded in 1502) and the University of Halle (founded in 1694). MLU is named after Protestant reformer Martin Luther, who was a professor in Wittenberg. Today, the university campus is located in Halle, while  Leucorea Foundation in Wittenberg serves as MLU's convention centre. Both Halle and Wittenberg are about one hour from Berlin via the Berlin–Halle railway, which offers Intercity-Express (ICE) trains.

History

University of Wittenberg (Universität Wittenberg) was founded in 1502 by Frederick the Wise, Elector of Saxony, as the Renaissance was becoming more and more popular. The foundation of the university was heavily criticized, especially when Martin Luther's Ninety-five Theses reached Albert of Brandenburg, the Archbishop of Mainz. Ecclesiastically speaking, the Electorate of Saxony was subordinate to Albert. He criticized the elector for Luther's theses, viewing the recently founded university as a breeding ground for heretical ideas. Under the influence of Philipp Melanchthon, building on the works of Martin Luther, the university became a centre of Protestant Reformation, even incorporating, at one point in time, Luther's house in Wittenberg, the Lutherhaus, as part of the campus. Notable alumni include George Müller, Georg Joachim Rheticus and – in fiction – William Shakespeare's Prince Hamlet and Horatio and Christopher Marlowe's Doctor Faustus.

University of Halle (Universität Halle) was founded in 1694 by Frederick III, Elector of Brandenburg, who became Frederick I, King in Prussia, in 1701.

In the late 17th century and early 18th century, Halle became a centre for Pietism within Prussia.

In the 17th and 18th centuries, the universities were centers of the German Enlightenment. Christian Wolff was an important proponent of rationalism. He influenced many German scholars, such as Immanuel Kant. Christian Thomasius was at the same time the first philosopher in Germany to hold his lectures not in Latin, but German. He contributed to a rational programme in philosophy but also tried to establish a more common-sense point of view, which was aimed against the unquestioned superiority of aristocracy and theology.

The institutionalisation of the local language (German) as the language of instruction, the prioritisation of rationalism over religious orthodoxy, new modes of teaching, and the ceding of control over their work to the professors themselves, were among various innovations which characterised the University of Halle, and have led to its being referred to as the first "modern" university, whose liberalism was adopted by the University of Göttingen about a generation later, and subsequently by other German and then most North American universities.

The University of Wittenberg was closed in 1813 during the Napoleonic Wars. The town of Wittenberg was granted to Prussia in the Congress of Vienna in 1815, and the university was then merged with the Prussian University of Halle in 1817. It took its present name on 10 November 1933.

Nazi period

Under the Nazi regime, more than a dozen professors were expelled. Others were shifted to Halle-Wittenberg from universities regarded as "better" at the time, which led to the university being called an academic Vorkuta (after the largest center of the Gulag camps in European Russia).

Faculties

Following the continental European academic tradition, MLU has 9 faculties, regrouping academic staff and students according to their field of studies (as opposed to the Anglo-Saxon collegiate university model):

Faculty of Theology
Faculty of Law and Economics
Faculty of Medicine 
Faculty of Philosophy I (Social and Cultural Studies, History, Archaeology and Art History)
Faculty of Philosophy II (Ancient and Modern Languages, Communication Studies, Music)
Faculty of Philosophy III (Paedagogy)
Faculty of Natural Sciences I (Biochemistry, Biology, Pharmacy) 
Faculty of Natural Sciences II (Physics, Chemistry, Mathematics) 
Faculty of Natural Sciences III (Agriculture, Geology, Computer Science)

Points of interest
 MLU's botanical garden, founded in 1698.
 MLU's historical observatory, built in 1788 by Carl Gotthard Langhans.

Cooperating research institutions

MLU is enclosed by a variety of research institutions, which have either institutional or personal links with the university or cooperate occasionally in their respective fields of studies:

The German Academy of Sciences Leopoldina
The Halle Institute for Economic Research
The Fraunhofer Institute for Mechanics of Materials
The Leibniz Institute of Agricultural Development in Central and Eastern Europe
The Leibniz Institute of Plant Biochemistry
The Max Planck Research Unit for Enzymology of Protein Folding
The Max Planck Institute for Social Anthropology
The Max Planck Institute of Microstructure Physics
The Helmholtz Centre for Environmental Research

Collegium musicum

Even though MLU is an academic, research oriented institution, not an academy of music or conservatory, the university has an academic orchestra, founded in 1779, and a rather prestigious choir, founded in 1950, which together constitute the so-called Collegium musicum. Members are mostly gifted students of all faculties, but also academic staff and alumni. The university choir regularly performs at the international Handel Festival in George Frideric Handel's birthplace, Halle.

Partner universities

MLU has many international partner universities, including:

Argentina: National University of La Plata
Armenia: Yerevan State University
Australia: University of Queensland
Austria: Johannes Kepler University Linz
Canada: University of Ottawa
Colombia: National University of Colombia and University of Atlántico
China: Beijing University of Chemical Technology
Czech Republic: Department of Musicology of Palacký University Faculty of Philosophy
France: Charles de Gaulle University – Lille III, Paris X University Nanterre
Hungary: University of Szeged
India: Jawaharlal Nehru University, New Delhi
Israel: Tel Aviv University, Ben-Gurion University of the Negev, Bar-Ilan University
Italy: University of Palermo, University of Pisa, University of Naples Federico II
Japan: Senshu University, Sophia University, Waseda University, Keio University
Mauritius: University of Mauritius
Mongolia: National University of Mongolia
Peru: National University of San Marcos
Poland: University of Gdańsk, Silesian University of Technology, Jan Kochanowski University, Adam Mickiewicz University in Poznań, Poznan University of Medical Sciences
Romania: Babeș-Bolyai University
Russia: M. V. Lomonosov Moscow State University, Moscow City Pedagogical University, Smolensk Humanitarian University, Bashkir State University, Voronezh State University, Joint Institute for Nuclear Research Dubna
Slovakia: Comenius University in Bratislava, Slovak University of Technology in Bratislava
Spain: University of Alcalá
South Africa: University of Pretoria, Stellenbosch University
South Korea: Hanbat National University
Syria: University of Damascus, Arab International University
United States: University of South Carolina, University of Alabama, University of Florida, Illinois Institute of Technology.

Notable scholars

Given the history and reputation of  MLU, numerous notable personalities attended the institution, such as Nobel laureates Emil Adolf von Behring, Gustav Ludwig Hertz, Hermann Staudinger and Karl Ziegler, as well as Anton Wilhelm Amo (the first black Sub-Saharan African known to have attended a European university), Dorothea Erxleben (the first female medical doctor in Germany), Henry Melchior Muhlenberg, the Patriarch of the Lutheran Church in America, and his son, Frederick Muhlenberg (the first Speaker of the House of Representatives of the United States), and Hans Dietrich Genscher (Germany's longest serving Foreign Minister and Vice Chancellor).

Cultural references 
University of Wittenberg is the alma mater of Prince Hamlet (as well as his acquaintances Rosencrantz and Guildenstern and Horatio) in William Shakespeare's play Hamlet, and Christopher Marlowe's Doctor Faustus.

See also

 List of early modern universities in Europe

Notes

References

External links

 

 
Halle (Saale)
Wittenberg
Halle-Wittenberg
Halle-Wittenberg
Martin Luther
Halle-Wittenberg
1502 establishments in the Holy Roman Empire
Educational institutions established in the 1690s
Pietism